BRP Andrés Bonifacio has been the name of more than one Philippine Navy ship, and may refer to:

 , an  formerly RVNS Lý Thường Kiệt she was acquired in 1976 and sold for scrap in 2003
 , a  formerly USCGC Boutwell she was acquired in 2016

Philippine Navy ship names